Creuzbourg's Jäger Corps (Jäger-Corps von Creuzbourg) was an independent Jäger battalion  raised by the county of Hesse-Hanau and put to the disposition of the British Crown, as part of the German Allied contingent during the American Revolutionary War. The corps fought at the Battle of Oriskany, although mostly serving as garrison of different Canadian posts.

Formation

When the American Revolution began, the British Army was too small to overwhelm the rebellious colonies with armed might. Subsequently, United Kingdom entered treaties with a number of German principalities, which provided the British Crown with allied contingents for service in North America in return for monetary subsidies. A mutual aid- and alliance treaty between United Kingdom and Hesse-Hanau was entered in February 1776.

A Jäger corps under the command of Lieutenant Colonel Karl Adolf Christoph von Creutzburg was among the units in the Hesse-Hanau contingent. The Jägers were recruited from state foresters and other professional hunters. They were selected for their marksmanship, and were all volunteers, in contrast with the drafted or pressed soldiers that filled the ranks of the Hesse-Hanau infantry. The pay was higher than for ordinary troops. The British government especially requested Jägers for the American campaign, as they were perceived as better able to endure the North American wilderness.

Operations

The Hesse-Hanau contingent arrived to Canada in the summer of 1777 and became part of General Burgoyne's army that after the Battle of Saratoga became American prisoners of war. Creuzbourg's Jäger Corps, however, escaped defeat and imprisonment, as it was to be a part of Barry St. Leger's western offensive during the Saratoga Campaign. Due to the slowness of wilderness travel, only one of the Corp's companies arrived in time to participate in this campaign. This single company made, however, a significant contribution to the American defeat at the Battle of Oriskany. The remaining companies did not join St. Leger until after the Siege of Fort Stanwix had ended and the Crown forces were retreating northward. 

During the winter of 1777-1778, Creuzbourg's Jäger Corps was quartered in the area southeast of 
Montreal. In August 1778 at least one company was based around Terrebonne. The winter of 1779-1780 was spent in cantonment at La Prairie and during the summer of 1781 the corps was part of Québec garrison. The winter of 1781-1782 spent in quarters in Saint-Vallier and Châteauguay; during the summer of 1782 the corps was posted to Île aux Noix and Lacolle, in the Montérégie region.

Disbandment

After the Treaty of Paris 1783 the Hesse-Hanau contingent was repatriated. Nevertheless, almost half of Creuzbourg's Jäger Corps chose to resign and settle in Canada. Their combat experience had been limited, but during long marches they had learned the way of the wilderness with hunting, fishing and snowshoeing, and enjoyed life much more than in Germany.

Organization
Four companies of 100 officers and men each.

Commanding officer and officers commanding companies
 Creutzburg, Carl Adolf Christoph von, Lieutenant Colonel, commanding officer.
 Franken, Hermann Albrecht von, Major.
 Castendyck, Wilhelm, Captain.
 Hildebrand, Jacob, Captain.
 Hugget, Sigismund, Captain.
 Wittgenstein, Count L. K. von, Captain.

Middle Staff
Bender, Xaverius, Regimental Surgeon.
 Kaup, Johann Jakob, Judge Advocate.
 Staudinger, Ernst Friedrich, Quartermaster.
 Velden, Wilhelm von den, Adjutant.
 Armorers, 2 
 Armorer's assistant 
 Wagoner for the war chest 
 Wagoners for the company wagons, 4 
 Provost

Company
 Captain
 First lieutenant
 Second lieutenant
 Sergeant-major
 Sergeant
 Quartermaster-sergeant
 Captain of arms
 Corporals, 6
 Surgeon's mate
 Buglers, 3
 Chasseurs, 78
 Officer's servants, 3
The colonel's company had one officer and one servant more, and two chasseurs less.

References

German units in British service in the American Revolutionary War
Infantry regiments of Germany